The first USS Pensacola was a screw steamer that served in the United States Navy during the U.S. Civil War.

Construction and commissioning
Pensacola was launched by the Pensacola Navy Yard on August 15, 1859, and commissioned there on December 5, 1859, for towing to Washington Navy Yard for installation of machinery. She was decommissioned January 31, 1860, and commissioned in full on September 16, 1861, Captain Henry W. Morris in command.

Service history

Civil War, 1862–1864

Pensacola departed Alexandria, Virginia on January 11, 1862, for the Gulf of Mexico to join Admiral David Farragut's newly created West Gulf Blockading Squadron. She steamed with that fleet in the historic dash past Confederate Fort St. Philip and Fort Jackson which protected New Orleans, Louisiana on April 24. The next day, Pensacola engaged batteries below that great Confederate metropolis. On April 26, a landing party of Marines raised the United States flag over the mint at New Orleans. Four of her sailors were awarded the Medal of Honor for their part in the battle: Boy Thomas Flood, Seaman Thomas Lyons, Captain of the Foretop James McLeod, and Quartermaster Louis Richards.

During the next two years, she helped guard the lower Mississippi River, returning to New York Navy Yard where she decommissioned April 29, 1864, for the installation of new and improved machinery originally intended for the cancelled sloop-of-war .

Pacific Squadron, 1866–1884
Recommissioned August 16, 1866, Pensacola sailed around Cape Horn to join the Pacific Squadron, serving from time to time as flagship. Her cruising ranged from Chile to Puget Sound and west to Hawaii. While in the harbor of Coquimbo, Chile, on 30 July 1873, Ordinary Seaman Patrick Regan jumped overboard and rescued a drowning shipmate, for which he was later awarded the Medal of Honor. But for two periods in ordinary, February 15, 1870 to October 14, 1871, and December 31, 1873 to July 13, 1874, Pensacola continued this duty until detached from the Pacific squadron in June 1883. Departing Callao, Peru on July 18, she sailed west across the Pacific and Indian Oceans, transited the Suez Canal, and steamed the length of the Mediterranean Sea before crossing the Atlantic to arrive in Hampton Roads on May 4, 1884. She decommissioned at Norfolk, Virginia on May 23.

Atlantic and Pacific, 1885–1892
Recommissioned April 4, 1885, Pensacola operated in European waters until returning to Norfolk in February 1888 for repairs. On April 7, 1889, she sank at Portsmouth Navy Yard when a drydock was inundated during a storm. Operations along the Atlantic Coast and a cruise along the coast of Africa ended when the ship returned to New York in May 1890. In August she headed back to familiar haunts in the Pacific, arriving in San Francisco on August 10, 1891. Following a visit to Hawaii, she decommissioned at Mare Island on April 18, 1892.

Training and receiving ship, 1898–1911
Recommissioned on November 22, 1898, Pensacola served as a training ship for Naval apprentices until going back into ordinary on May 31, 1899. She was back in commission July 14, 1901, subsequently used as receiving ship at Yerba Buena Training Station, San Francisco until finally decommissioning on December 6, 1911, and struck from the Navy Register on December 23. She was burned and sunk by the Navy in San Francisco Bay near Hunters Point early in May 1912.

See also

Union Navy

References
 (Pensacola and Wanaloset)

See also
 

 

Ships of the Union Navy
Ships built in Florida
Steamships of the United States Navy
Gunboats of the United States Navy
American Civil War patrol vessels of the United States
Shipwrecks of the California coast
1859 ships
Maritime incidents in April 1889
Ship fires
Scuttled vessels
Maritime incidents in 1912